Barwick may refer to:

People
Barwick (surname)
The Barwick baronets, a titled family in England
Daniel Barwick, an American author, fundraiser, journalist, podcaster, higher education administrator, and teacher.

Placenames
Barwick, Devon, a village in Devon, England
Barwick, Georgia, a town in Thomas County, Georgia, United States
Barwick, Kentucky
Barwick, Hertfordshire, a village in Hertfordshire, England
Barwick, Norfolk, a hamlet and civil parish in Norfolk, England
Barwick, Ontario, Canada
Barwick, Somerset, a village and civil parish in Somerset, England
Barwick-in-Elmet, a village in West Yorkshire, England
Barwick in Elmet and Scholes, a civil parish in West Yorkshire, England
Ingleby Barwick, a suburb of Stockton-on-Tees, North Yorkshire, England

Other uses
"Barwick Green", the theme music to The Archers
 Barwick School, an independent preparatory school in Mashonaland Central, Zimbabwe